The Yixian Formation is a geological formation in Jinzhou, Liaoning, People's Republic of China, that spans about 1.6 million years during the early Cretaceous period (Barremian-Aptian stage). It is known for its fossils, listed below.

The Yixian Formation is divided into the following subunits: (ages from Zhong et al., 2021 unless otherwise noted)

 Upper Yixian (124.1 Ma) ("Jingangshan Bed") ("Dawangzhangzi Bed")
 Upper Lava Unit
 Jianshangou Unit (125.46 Ma)
 Lower Lava Unit
 Lujiatun Unit (125.76-125.68 Ma)

Sauropods

Ornithischians
The dinosaurs listed below were compiled in a survey by Xu and Norell in 2006, unless otherwise noted.

Theropods
The dinosaurs listed below were compiled in a survey by Xu and Norell in 2006, unless otherwise noted.

Avialans

Dromaeosaurs and troodontids

Other theropods

Pterosaurs
The pterosaurs listed below were compiled in a survey by Wang and Zhou in 2006, unless otherwise noted.

Misc. reptiles

Choristoderans

Lizards

Turtles

Mammals

The mammals listed below were compiled in a survey by Meng and colleagues in 2006, unless otherwise noted.

Amphibians

Fish

Invertebrate fauna of the Yixian Formation
The invertebrate species listed below follow a survey by Chen and colleagues published in 2005, unless otherwise noted.

Arachnids
The arachnid species listed below follow a catalogue compiled by Dunlop, Penney and Jekel in 2010, unless otherwise noted.

Beetles (Coleoptera)

Crustaceans

Dragonflies (Odonata)

The dragonfly species listed below follow a review compiled by Zhang, Ren and Panf in 2008, unless otherwise noted.

Flies (Diptera)

Wasps (Hymenoptera)

Other insects

Molluscs

Flora of the Yixian Formation

Conifers
The coniferous trees and shrubs listed below were compiled in a survey by Wang and colleagues in 2006, unless otherwise noted.

Ferns

Flowering plants

Ginkgos

Other plants

References 

Early Cretaceous Asia
Cretaceous China
Fossils of China
Prehistoric biotas